USNS Fall River (JHSV-4/T-EPF-4) is the fourth , which is operated by the United States Navys Military Sealift Command (MSC).  Fall River was built by Austal USA in Mobile, Alabama.

Capabilities

The EPF will be able to transport US Army and US Marine Corps company-sized units with their vehicles, or reconfigure to become a troop transport for an infantry battalion.  
 
It will have a flight deck for helicopter operations and a loading ramp that will allow vehicles to quickly drive on and off the ship. The ramp will be suitable for the types of austere piers and quay walls common in developing countries. EPF will have a shallow draft (under ).

Construction and career 
On 23 March 2010, Secretary of the Navy Ray Mabus announced in Fall River, Massachusetts that the fourth Expeditionary Fast Transport will be named USNS Fall River.  Because the ship will be operated by the Military Sealift Command and not the United States Navy itself, it will carry the USNS prefix instead of USS.

The ship was christened on 11 January 2014 by First Lady of Massachusetts, Diane Bemus Patrick, at Austal USA's Shipyard in Mobile, Alabama. The ship was launched seven days later on 16 January. Fall River completed acceptance trials on 25 July 2014.  Following delivery and Final Contract Trials (FCT) later in the year, Fall River was accepted into MSC service on 15 September 2014.

References

External links

 

Transports of the United States Navy
Spearhead-class Joint High Speed Vessels
2014 ships